Michigan Dept. of State Police v. Sitz, 496 U.S. 444 (1990), was a United States Supreme Court case involving the constitutionality of police sobriety checkpoints. The Court held 6-3 that these checkpoints met the Fourth Amendment standard of "reasonable search and seizure."

Background
In the state of Michigan, the state police adopted the practice of using random sobriety checkpoints to catch drunk drivers. A group of Michigan residents sued on the grounds that their Fourth Amendment rights prohibiting unreasonable search and seizure were being violated.

As the dissenting opinion by Justice Stevens explains, "a sobriety checkpoint is usually operated at night at an unannounced location. Surprise is crucial to its method. The test operation conducted by the Michigan State Police and the Saginaw County Sheriff's Department began shortly after midnight and lasted until about 1 a.m. During that period, the 19 officers participating in the operation made two arrests and stopped and questioned 124 other unsuspecting and innocent drivers" 

During the operation, drivers would be stopped and briefly questioned while in their vehicles. If an officer suspected the driver was intoxicated, the driver would be sent off for a field sobriety test.

Holding
The Supreme Court held that Michigan had a "substantial government interest" to advance in stopping drunk driving, and that this technique was rationally related to achieving that goal (though there was some evidence to the contrary). The Court also held that the impact on drivers, such as in delaying them from reaching their destination, was negligible, and that the brief questioning to gain "reasonable suspicion" similarly had a negligible impact on the drivers' Fourth Amendment right from unreasonable search (implying that any more detailed or invasive searches would be treated differently). Applying a balancing test, then, the Court found that the Constitutionality of the search tilted in favor of the government.

See also
 Illinois v. Lidster (2004)
 United States v. Martinez-Fuerte (1976)
 List of United States Supreme Court cases, volume 496

External links
 
 

United States Supreme Court cases
United States Supreme Court cases of the Rehnquist Court
United States Fourth Amendment case law
1990 in United States case law
Saginaw County, Michigan
Driving under the influence
Checkpoints
Law enforcement in Michigan